(Seyyed) Yousef Tabatabai Nejad (sometimes spelled as Tabatabaei-Nejad) is an Iranian Shia cleric and Friday leading prayer that represents the Isfahan Province in Iran's Assembly of Experts.

Views
In 2015, he said women should be denied working in stores and offices.
In 2019, he made municipality of Isfahan to deny women access to bicycles legally shutting down two city bicycle stations.

In 2016, he claimed that the act of women taking pictures of themselves in the Zayanderud river contributed to a drought in said river. 

He is critical of possible changing of supreme leader position to council.

On October 1, 2020, while meeting with the NAJA and the Intelligence Ministry of Iran, he believes that law enforcement should make, "the life of the unveiled unsafe". This has raised concerns for repeated Acid attacks on women in Isfahan.

References

Members of the Assembly of Experts
Living people
Representatives of the Supreme Leader in the Provinces of Iran
Shia clerics from Isfahan
1944 births